Roger Woodward Gibbs (2 October 1932 – 25 October 2012) was a New Zealand swimmer who represented New Zealand at the 1950 British Empire Games.

Biography
Born in Christchurch on 2 October 1932, Gibbs was a 17-year-old schoolboy when he was selected to swim for New Zealand at the 1950 British Empire Games in Auckland. In his heat of the men's 110 yards backstroke, he swam a time of 1:18.7 and did not progress to the final.

Gibbs later worked as a wool buyer and an insurance company manager, and retired to Greytown after living in the Wellington suburb of Wadestown for 40 years. He died on 25 October 2012, and was survived by his wife, Jill.

References

1932 births
2012 deaths
Swimmers from Christchurch
New Zealand male backstroke swimmers
Swimmers at the 1950 British Empire Games
Commonwealth Games competitors for New Zealand
20th-century New Zealand people
21st-century New Zealand people